Lee Sang-Duk  (Hangul: 이상덕; born 5 November 1986) is a South Korean football centre back.

Club career
Lee was selected by the Daegu FC in the fifth round of the 2009 K-League Draft on 20 November 2009. Lee made his K-League debut on 8 March 2009 in a match against Seongnam Ilhwa. He scored his first career K-league goal against Pohang Steelers in a 2–2 draw on 22 March 2009. He went on to score three goals in just seven games during the season.

It was announced in August 2011 that Lee would not be able to play in the all football league system in South Korea until August 2014, on a charge of being implicated in the 2011 South Korean football betting scandal.

International career
Lee received his first call up to the South Korea squad for the friendly against Turkey on 10 February 2011, but he did not play in the game.

Club career statistics 
as of 25 July 2011

References

External links 

1986 births
Living people
Association football defenders
South Korean footballers
Daegu FC players
K League 1 players
Dong-a University alumni